Dotted Swiss (foaled 1956 in Kentucky) was an American Thoroughbred racehorse best known for winning the Hollywood Gold Cup in 1960. He was bred and raced by C. V. Whitney, a member of New York City's prominent Vanderbilt family. His dam was Swistar, a daughter of the 1944 American Champion Two-Year-Old Colt and 1945 Belmont Stakes winner, Pavot. Dotted Swiss was sired by Counterpoint, the 1951 American Horse of the Year and American Champion Three-Year-Old Male Horse. Counterpoint was a son of 1943 U.S. Triple Crown champion Count Fleet.

References

1956 racehorse births
Thoroughbred family 5-j
Racehorses bred in Kentucky
Racehorses trained in the United States